Muttiah Manickam was a Ceylon Tamil politician and member of the Senate of Ceylon. Manickam's daughter Kala was married to Member of Parliament Sam Tambimuttu.

References

Illankai Tamil Arasu Kachchi politicians
Members of the Senate of Ceylon
People from British Ceylon
Sri Lankan Tamil politicians
Year of birth missing
Year of death missing